Nucșoara is a commune in Argeș County, Muntenia, Romania. It is composed of four villages: Gruiu, Nucșoara, Sboghițești and Slatina.

The commune is located in the northern part of the county, on the border with Brașov County. It is nestled on the southern slopes of the Făgăraș Mountains, at the foot of Moldoveanu Peak, the highest mountain peak in Romania. The Râul Doamnei river has its source in the area, and runs through Slatina and Sboghițești.

Notable residents
Toma Arnăuțoiu
Elisabeta Rizea
Bogdan Suceavă

References

Communes in Argeș County
Localities in Muntenia